Amor and Language is an EP by the experimental rock band Red Krayola, released in 1995 by Drag City.

Model Rachel Williams posed for the album's cover.

Critical reception
CMJ New Music Monthly called the EP an "opportunity to observe a venturesome mind and his talented entourage." AllMusic wrote that "this is about as gentle as '90s experimental rock gets, and not without its pleasing riffs here and there."

Track listing

Personnel 
Consuelo & Meme
Tricia Donnelly
John Elder
David Grubbs
George Hurley
Margo Leavin
Steve Linn
Sharon Lockhart
John McEntire
Albert Oehlen
Jim O'Rourke
Stephen Prina
Franz Schnaas
Alex Slade
Mayo Thompson
Tom Watson
Christopher Williams
Rachel Williams
Steven Wong

References

External links 
 

1995 EPs
Drag City (record label) EPs
Red Krayola albums